Hold Me is the third album by Japanese pop-rock group Zard and was released on September 2, 1992, under the Polydor label. In 1992, the album was released as a CD and cassette. In 1993, B-Gram Records re-released this album under CD format with code BGCH-1005.

Chart performance
The album reached number two in Japan in its first week of release. It charted for 71 weeks and sold, in total, 1,065,000 copies.

Track listing

In media
"Ano Hohoemi wo Wasurenaide" is theme song for drama series Udemakuri Kangofu Monogatari
"Dareka ga Matteru" is theme song for Nihon TV program Magical Zunou Power!
"Nemurenai Yoru wo Daite" is ending theme for TV Asahi program Tonight

References 

Zard albums
1992 albums
Being Inc. albums
Japanese-language albums
Albums produced by Daiko Nagato

Chart positions
{| class="wikitable"
!Year
!Album
!Chart
!Position
!Weeks
!Annual Sales
!Total Sales
!Yearly Position
|-
|1992
|HOLD ME
|Japanese Oricon Weekly Albums Chart (Top 100)
|2
|71
|536,020
|rowspan=2|1,056,130
|26